The Institut national de la santé et de la recherche médicale (Inserm) is the French National Institute of Health and Medical Research.

History and organisation 
Inserm was created in 1964 as a successor to the French National Institute of Health.

Inserm is the only public research institution solely focused on human health and medical research in France. It is a public institution with a scientific and technical vocation under the dual auspices of the Ministry of Health and the Ministry of Research. Similarly to the US National Institutes of Health, Inserm conducts fundamental and translational research projects through 339 research units, run by around 13,000 scientists, including 5,100 permanent research staff members and 5,100 staff members co-affiliated with university hospitals and medicine faculties. Inserm's laboratories and research units are located all over France, mainly in the largest cities. Eighty percent of Inserm research units are embedded in research hospitals of French universities.

Inserm's CEO is chosen by decree upon a proposal of the Ministers of Health and Research, advised by a review committee. The CEO since January 2019 is Gilles Bloch, a doctor and researcher specializing in medical imaging.

Ranking
According to the 2019 Scimago Institutions Ranking, Inserm is ranked 2nd best research institution in the health sector (behind the NIH), and 22nd across all sectors.

Awards

Nobel prizes
Two Inserm research scientists have been awarded by the Nobel Prize in Physiology or Medicine. In 1980, the French immunologist Jean Dausset received the Nobel prize (along with Baruj Benacerraf and George Davis Snell), for his work on the discovery and characterisation of the genes making the major histocompatibility complex. In 2008, the French virologist Françoise Barré-Sinoussi was awarded, together with her former mentor Luc Montagnier, for the identification of the human immunodeficiency virus.

Grand prix de l'Inserm
Each year, Inserm awards three researchers in three major distinct categories. The Grand prix de l'Inserm recognizes major advancements in biology for an active researcher of the institution, the Grand prix d'honneur recognizes a French public institution's researcher whose contributions have had a major impact in science, and the Prix étranger (Foreign Prize) awards a foreign researcher for their particular contributions to biomedical research. In addition the Inserm has internal awards for engineers and young researchers.

Awardees

Notes and references

External links
  (English)